Zakynthos may refer to:

Zakynthos, a Greek island in the Ionian Sea
Zakynthos (city), the main town on the island Zakynthos
Zakynthos International Airport, on the island Zakynthos
Zakynthos (person), a figure in Greek mythology, first settler of the island Zakynthos